Fort Marcy (April 2, 1964 – August 14, 1991) was an American Thoroughbred racehorse. His grandsire was the important Italian horse, Nearco. In 1970 he earned three Champion titles. He was named Horse of the Year in a poll by the publishers of Daily Racing Form receiving 21 of the 42 votes ahead of Personality (10 votes) and Ta Wee (9 votes). Personality won a rival poll conducted by the Thoroughbred Racing Association. He competed for six years until his retirement at the end of the 1971 racing season.

Fort Marcy died in 1991 at Rokeby Farm in Upperville, Virginia. In 1998, he was voted into the National Museum of Racing and Hall of Fame.

References

 Fort Marcy's pedigree and racing stats
 Fort Marcy at the United States' National Museum of Racing and Hall of Fame

1964 racehorse births
1991 racehorse deaths
Racehorses bred in Virginia
Racehorses trained in the United States
Eclipse Award winners
American Thoroughbred Horse of the Year
United States Thoroughbred Racing Hall of Fame inductees
Thoroughbred family 2-n